The following is a comprehensive discography of Deadmau5, a Canadian record producer and DJ. His discography most notably comprises eight studio albums, nine compilation albums, one soundtrack album, two video albums, seven mix albums, six extended plays, 48 singles, and 18 music videos.

Albums

Studio albums

Compilation albums

Soundtrack albums

Mix albums

Video albums

Extended plays

Singles

The original mix of "I Said" was not released on an album. However, the Michael Woods remix was included on 4×4=12.

Other charted songs

Guest appearances

Remixes

Productions

Music videos

As lead artist

Video games
Dota 2 Dieback Music Pack (2015)

Notes

References

External links
 deadmau5.com official site

 
Discographies of Canadian artists
Electronic music discographies